Stigmella rhamnophila is a moth of the family Nepticulidae. It is found in Italy, Greece (including many of the islands), Cyprus and Israel.

The larvae feed on Rhamnus alaternus, Rhamnus lycioides, Rhamnus lycioides oleoides, Rhamnus palaestina and Rhamnus saxatilis. They mine the leaves of their host plant. The mine consists of a rather long corridor, suddenly turning into an elongated, full depth blotch. The corridor usually follows the leaf margin for a long distance. The frass fills most of the corridor In the first section.

External links
Fauna Europaea
bladmineerders.nl

Nepticulidae
Moths of Europe
Moths of Asia
Moths described in 1934